Filip Trpchevski (born 4 May 2003) is a professional footballer who plays as a winger for Häcken. Born in Sweden, he is a youth international for North Macedonia.

Career
A youth product of Backatorps IF, Trpchevski moved to Häcken's academy in 2015. He made his professional debut with them in a 2–1 Allsvenskan win over Degerfors IF on 9 April 2022. In May 2022, after 6 appearances in 8 games for the club he suffered a cruciate ligament injury, prematurely ending his debut season.

International career
Born in Sweden, Trpchevski is of Macedonian descent. He is a youth international for North Macedonia, having represented them from U16 to U20 levels.

Honours 
BK Häcken

 Allsvenskan: 2022

References

External links
 
 BK Häcken profile
 Svenskfotboll profile
 

2003 births
Living people
Sportspeople from Gothenburg
Macedonian footballers
North Macedonia youth international footballers
Swedish footballers
Swedish people of Macedonian descent
BK Häcken players
Allsvenskan players
Association football wingers